NGC 4754 is a barred lenticular galaxy located about 53 million light-years away in the constellation of Virgo. NGC 4754 was discovered by astronomer William Herschel on March 15, 1784. It forms a non-interacting pair with the edge-on lenticular galaxy NGC 4762. NGC 4754 is a member of the Virgo Cluster.

See also 
 List of NGC objects (4001–5000)
 NGC 4477

References

External links
 

Barred lenticular galaxies
Virgo (constellation)
4754
43656
8010
Astronomical objects discovered in 1784
Virgo Cluster